Edmonton is the capital city of the Canadian province Alberta.

Edmonton may also refer to:

Places

Australia

 Edmonton, Queensland, a town and suburb in Cairns

Canada
 Edmonton Metropolitan Region
 Snelgrove, Ontario, previously known as Edmonton

Electoral districts
 Edmonton (electoral district), Canadian federal riding between 1903 and 1914
 Edmonton (N.W.T. electoral district), a Canadian riding in the Northwest Territories from 1883 to 1905
 Edmonton (provincial electoral district), Alberta provincial electoral district from 1905–1909 and 1921–1955
 Edmonton-Castle Downs, Alberta provincial electoral district
 Edmonton Centre, Canadian federal electoral district
 Edmonton-Ellerslie, Alberta provincial electoral district
 Edmonton-Whitemud, Alberta provincial electoral district

England
 Edmonton, Cornwall
 Edmonton, London
 Edmonton Hundred, an ancient hundred in north Middlesex
 Municipal Borough of Edmonton, a local government (1850–1965)
 Edmonton (UK Parliament constituency), the Parliamentary constituency corresponding to Edmonton, London

United States
 Edmonton, Kentucky, United States

Religion
 Anglican Diocese of Edmonton, a diocese of the Ecclesiastical Province of Rupert's Land of the Anglican Church of Canada
 Roman Catholic Archdiocese of Edmonton, a Roman Catholic archdiocese in the Province of Alberta

Sports
 Edmonton Elks, formerly Edmonton Eskimos, a professional Canadian Football League (CFL) team based in Edmonton, Alberta
 Edmonton Oil Kings, a major junior ice hockey team based in Edmonton, Alberta, Canada that play in the Western Hockey League
 Edmonton Oilers, a professional ice hockey team based in Edmonton, Alberta. They are members of the Pacific Division of the Western Conference of the National Hockey League (NHL)
 Edmonton Rush, a professional lacrosse team in the National Lacrosse League (NLL) that played from 2006 NLL season to 2015, they now play in Saskatoon as the Saskatchewan Rush.
 Edmonton International Raceway, a 1/4 mile paved oval auto racing facility

People
 Dennis Edmonton (born 1943), former stage name of Canadian rock musician Mars Bonfire, writer of the hit song "Born to Be Wild" for Steppenwolf
 Jerry Edmonton (1946 – 1993), Canadian rock musician and drummer for the rock band Steppenwolf

Other uses
 96193 Edmonton, an asteroid
 Edmonton Green railway station, a railway station
 Edmonton tornado, a large tornado
 HMCS Edmonton, a vessel of the Canadian Forces
 West Edmonton Mall, a shopping mall in Edmonton, Alberta, Canada

See also
 Edmontosaurus, a dinosaur